Simon Peter Lizotte (born November 17, 1992) is a German professional disc golfer now based in Shrewsbury, Massachusetts, United States, with career earnings of $234,770. In January 2023 he signed a ten-year sponsorship deal with MVP Discs, reported to be worth more than $1M per year; for the previous ten years he had been sponsored by Discmania Discs. 2022 was his most successful season to date, with four Elite Series wins on the Disc Golf Pro Tour, as well as five other top ten finishes. Lizotte has acquired a significant following for his disc golf-related videos on YouTube, with 170,000 subscribers in January 2023.  He is also noted for holding the disc golf distance world record on several occasions.

Professional career

National Tour wins (5)

A-Tier wins (8)

World distance records

Lizotte set the world record for longest throw of a disc golf disc on October 27, 2014 at 863.5 ft (263.2 m). This beat David Wiggins Jr.'s previous record of 836 ft set in 2012. Lizotte broke his own record on March 27, 2016 with a throw of 903.9 ft (275.5 m), a record that stood for two days until Wiggins Jr. threw for 1,108.9 ft (338 m). Lizotte then set a personal record of 1030 ft.

Wind has played a significant role in world distance records. Wiggins' 2012 record was set with a 14.5 mph tailwind, while Lizotte's 2014 record was aided by an 18 mph tailwind. His 903.9 ft throw took place in a 30 mph wind, and the two players' throws over 1,000 ft were in a 38-42 mph wind. Both Lizotte and Wiggins have stated that new distance records must be established with wind limits.

Summary

*Through September 2022

Career summary

*As of 1/8/2023

Equipment

Announced January 2023, Lizotte signed a 10 year deal with MVP Disc Sports. Lizotte is also sponsored by Grip Equipment and has a signature bag with them.  When he was sponsored by Discmania Discs he had a number of signature discs (marked with *), and carried a combination of the following discs:

Distance Drivers
PD2 (C-line, Swirly S-Line, Luster C-Line)
DD3 (S-Line)

Fairway Drivers
PD (C-line)
FD (C-line, D-Line, S-Line)
FD3 (Swirly S-Line (Doom Bird II*))
Tilt* (Hard Exo Vapor, Meta)

Midranges
MD (C-line)
MD3 (Glow C-line)
MD5 (S-Line)
Mutant (Neo)

Putters
P1x (D-Line)
P2 (C-Line (Sky God*), D-line)
Logic (Exo Hard)

Bags
GRIPeq Ax5 (Gorilla Bag)

References

Living people
1992 births
Sportspeople from Bremen
Disc golfers